Popular Astronomy  may refer to:

Popular Astronomy (US magazine), the magazine published from 1893-1951 in the US
Popular Astronomy (UK magazine), the magazine currently published in the UK
Populär Astronomi, a Swedish magazine